Piz Tschütta (also known as Stammerspitz) is a mountain of the Samnaun Alps, overlooking Samnaun in the canton of Graubünden.

It lies about 3 km north-west from the Muttler, the highest mountain of the Samnaun Alps. The first ascent was on 16. August 1884 by K. Schulze, Johann Nell and Seraphim Kuppelwieser.

References

External links
 Piz Tschütta on Hikr

Mountains of the Alps
Mountains of Graubünden
Alpine three-thousanders
Mountains of Switzerland
Samnaun